Iga Wyrwał (born 20 February 1989), also known as Eva or Eve, is a Polish actress and former glamour model.

Career
In 2006, Wyrwał moved from Poland to Rugby, Warwickshire in England. In 2008, she was signed as a cover girl for Nuts magazine. She was introduced in April of that year as "the sexiest new babe in Britain", and later that month was ranked first in the magazine's "100 Sexiest Topless Babes 2008" list.

Wyrwał has appeared in various men's magazines, including Front, the Polish edition of Playboy and CKM. She has appeared in many shoots for various websites, including MET-Art, Breathtakers and Onlytease; and she has been featured in the UK national newspaper Daily Star as a Page 3 girl.

In 2009, Wyrwał appeared on Season 10 of Taniec z Gwiazdami, the Polish edition of Strictly Come Dancing, finishing 11th.

She played Regina, second wife of the Dwarf King, in the 2011 movie Your Highness, starring Danny McBride, James Franco and Natalie Portman.

Personal life
In January 2009, Wyrwał announced that she was pregnant. The father of the child was reported to be BBC graphic designer Martin Fausek.

See also

Lad culture
Lad mags
The Sun newspaper

References

External links

1989 births
Living people
Glamour models
Page 3 girls
People from Kalisz
Polish expatriates in the United Kingdom
Polish actresses
Polish female models